Luis Isaác Robles Mejía (born 6 March 1993) is a Mexican professional footballer who currently plays for Celaya.

Honours

Club
Chapulineros de Oaxaca
 Liga de Balompié Mexicano: 2020–21, 2021

References

External links
 

1993 births
Living people
Association football goalkeepers
Unión de Curtidores footballers
Cañoneros de Campeche footballers
Tecamachalco F.C. footballers
Ascenso MX players
Alebrijes de Oaxaca players
Tampico Madero F.C. footballers
Chapulineros de Oaxaca footballers
Club Celaya footballers
Liga Premier de México players
Tercera División de México players
Footballers from the State of Mexico
People from Nezahualcóyotl
Liga de Balompié Mexicano players
Mexican footballers